The 1928 Chachapoyas earthquake occurred on May 14 at . It had a magnitude of Mw 7.2, Ms 7.3, or ML 7.3. Chachapoyas, Peru was almost completely destroyed. A landslide in Pinpincos caused the death of 25 people. Many houses were damaged in Machala, Ecuador. The maximum intensity was X (Extreme) on the Mercalli intensity scale. The earthquake could be felt in Lima. It could also be felt in Ecuador, Brazil, and Colombia.

Aftershock 
A strong aftershock occurred on July 18, 1928, at 14:05 local time (19:05 UTC). Some houses which had already been damaged in the main shock collapsed.

See also
List of earthquakes in 1928
List of earthquakes in Peru

References

External links

Earthquakes in Peru
Chachapoyas earthquake, 1928
Chachapoyas earthquake, 1928
1928 disasters in Peru